Kazakh, Qazaq or Kazakhstani may refer to:

 Someone or something related to Kazakhstan
Kazakhs, an ethnic group
Kazakh language
The Kazakh Khanate
Kazakh cuisine
Qazakh Rayon, Azerbaijan
Qazax, Azerbaijan
Kazakh Uyezd, administrative district of Elisabethpol Governorate during Russian rule in Azerbaijan
Khazak, Iran, a village in Fars Province, Iran

See also  
 Cossack (disambiguation)
 Kazaky, Ukrainian pop band
 Kazak (disambiguation)

Language and nationality disambiguation pages